Valentinovka is a rural locality (a selo) and the administrative center of Inzersky Selsoviet, Arkhangelsky District, Bashkortostan, Russia. The population was 592 as of 2010. There are 12 streets.

Geography 
Valentinovka is located 20 km north of Arkhangelskoye (the district's administrative centre) by road. Sukhopol is the nearest rural locality.

References 

Rural localities in Arkhangelsky District